An Ethics Lesson (lit. "The Ethics of Anger") is a 2013 South Korean film starring Lee Je-hoon, Cho Jin-woong, Kim Tae-hoon, Kwak Do-won and Moon So-ri. Written and directed by Park Myoung-rang, the crime thriller centers on four suspicious men involved in a college girl's murder.

Plot
A beautiful college girl is murdered. Upon her death, the men in her life become aware of each other's existence. A wire-tapping neighbor, a loan shark, her adulterous lover, and her righteous ex reveal their true nature, dragging all of them further down to the ruthless abyss.

Cast

Lee Je-hoon as Kim Jung-hoon, a policeman 
Cho Jin-woong as Park Myung-rok, a loan shark
Kim Tae-hoon as Han Hyun-soo, the ex-boyfriend
Kwak Do-won as Kim Soo-taek, a professor 
Moon So-ri as Kim Sun-hwa, Soo-taek's wife 
Ko Sung-hee as Jin-ah
Han Seung-yong as Min-tae
Park Byung-eun as Lee Ji-hoon, a photographer
Lee Na-ra as Eun-young
Lee Sae-byul as Ji-yeon
Lee Seung-joon as Investigator for the prosecution
Choi Gwang-il as Defense lawyer Choi
Lee Dong-ha as Prosecutor Im
Kim Gi-cheon as Security guard
Min Bok-gi as GG boss
Park Gil-soo as Owner of electronics store
Jin Yong-wook as Detective Moon

References

External links
  
 
 
 

2013 films
South Korean mystery films
South Korean thriller films
Lotte Entertainment films
2010s South Korean films